The Men's four-man bobsleigh competition at the 1984 Winter Olympics in Sarajevo, Yugoslavia was held on 17 and 18 February, at the Sarajevo Olympic Bobsleigh and Luge Track on the mountain of Trebević. This was one of two bobsleigh events at these games.

The gold-winning pairing of Wolfgang Hoppe and Dietmar Schauerhammer from the two-man event, won their second golds as part of the four-man team. With every run, the best 3 runs were always the order of medallists.

Results

All 24 teams entered for the event completed all four runs

References

External links
Official Olympic Report
Sport Statistics - International Competitions Archive

Bobsleigh at the 1984 Winter Olympics